Al-Hodoud (Arabic: الحدود) is a 1984 Syrian political comedy film directed by Duraid Lahham who played the main character and co-wrote the film with Muhammad al-Maghut.

Overview 
The film criticizes the idea of borders between Arabic countries, which is a recurring theme in other works by Lahham and Maghut.

It was included in The Greatest 100 Arabic Films list, released by Dubai International Film Festival in 2013.

Cast 

 Duraid Lahham: Abd el-Wadoud el-Tayieh
 Raghda: Sudfa
 Mohammed el-Akkad: Driver
 Mohammad el-Sheikh Najib: Sudfa's father
 Hassan Dakak: Checkpoint officer
 Rashid Assaf: Gharbstan patrol officer
 Ahmed Rafea: Sharqstan officer
 Mahmoud Zouhdi: Gharbstan officer

References 

1980 films
1980s political comedy films
Syrian comedy films
1980s Arabic-language films